The Middelburg Gazette was a newspaper that operated from Middelburg in the Cape Colony, for a brief period from 1876 to 1881.

References

Defunct newspapers published in South Africa
Publications established in 1876
Publications disestablished in 1881
1876 establishments in the Cape Colony